Dysstroma cinereata is a moth of the  family Geometridae. It is found in eastern Asia.

The wingspan is 28–35 mm.

Subspecies
Dysstroma cinereata cinereata (India, Taiwan)
Dysstroma cinereata japonicum Heydemann, 1929 (Japan, Korea)

References

Cidariini
Moths described in 1867
Moths of Asia
Moths of Japan
Moths of Korea
Moths of Taiwan